The Bubisa Wind Power Station is a planned 300 megawatts wind power energy project, in Kenya. The power station is owned and under development by Gitson Energy, an independent power producer (IPP), owned by Kenyans in the diaspora. The project received initial regulatory approval in 2010. However, land acquisition delays, followed by backtracking by the Kenyan government, forced the owner/investor to go to court for redress. In the fourth quarter of calendar year 2021, the Kenya High Court, sitting in the city of Mombasa, restored the rights of the owner/investor to proceed with development of the power station.

Location
The wind farm would be located near the settlement of Bubisa, in Marsabit County, in Kenya's arid northwest.

Overview
The planned generation capacity of this wind farm is 300 megawatts. Delays in the land acquisition process and then withdrawal of licensing, after it was granted, delayed commencement of construction since 2010.

A court ruling in November 2021, directed regulatory agencies within the Government of Kenya, to issue unencumbered licenses to Gitson Energy, the owner/developer of this wind farm.

The  power would be sold to Kenya Power and Lighting.

Funding
Initially, the World Bank had agreed to provide funding for this renewable energy project. In 2012, the World Bank pulled out of this deal.

Gitson Energy has been promised funding from various sources, including (a) the Export–Import Bank of the United States (b) the Overseas Private Investment Corporation, which today is the U.S. International Development Finance Corporation.

See also

 List of power stations in Kenya
 Lake Turkana Wind Power Station

References

External links
 Kenya’s 300 MW wind farm gets green lit As of 25 November 2021.

Economy of Kenya
Power stations in Kenya
Wind farms in Kenya
Energy infrastructure in Africa
Marsabit County